Équateur is one of the 21 new provinces of the Democratic Republic of the Congo created in the 2015 repartitioning. Équateur, Mongala, Nord-Ubangi, Sud-Ubangi, and Tshuapa provinces are the result of the dismemberment of the former Équateur province.  The new province was formed from the Équateur district and the independently administered city of Mbandaka which retained its status as a provincial capital.

History

The province of Équateur created in 1917 was much larger than today. Over time it went through a number of border and name changes. Under Article 2 of the 2006 Constitution it was to assume its current boundaries, but administratively they were not finalized until 2015.

Administrative divisions
The province consists of eight administrative subdivisions, one of which is the provincial capital, Mbandaka; and seven of which are territories:
 Bikoro Territory (Bukoro Territory) with the town of Bikoro
 Lukolela Territory with the town of Lukolela
 Basankusu Territory with the town of Basankusu
 Makanza Territory with the town of Makanza
 Bolomba Territory with the town of Bolomba
 Bomongo Territory with the town of Bomongo
 Ingende Territory with the town of Ingende

See also
Bolenge

References

See also

 Équateur (former province)

 
Provinces of the Democratic Republic of the Congo
2015 establishments in the Democratic Republic of the Congo